Clinton John Whitelaw (born 24 December 1970) is a South African professional golfer.

Whitelaw was born  in Johannesburg. He turned professional in 1990 and has competed predominantly on the Southern Africa-based Sunshine Tour since then, where he has won three tournaments, including the Philips South African Open in 1993. He also played on the Canadian Tour during his early career.

Whitelaw played on the European Tour the late 1990s, having won his card at the qualifying school at the end of 1996. He won the Moroccan Open in 1997, and went on to finish 54th on the Order of Merit that season. However he was unable to repeat that performance in the following seasons due to a recurring lumbar spine injury.

Whitelaw effectively retired from tournament golf in 2000, playing only a few events on the Sunshine Tour each year through 2011. He is now an instructor and works as a head teaching professional in Sarasota, Florida.

Amateur wins
Transvaal Strokeplay Championship
Northern Transvaal Strokeplay Championship
Western Transvaal Strokeplay Championship
Transvaal Under 23 Strokeplay Championships

Professional wins(5)

European Tour wins (1)

Sunshine Tour wins (3)

Other wins (1)
1993 California State Open

External links

South African male golfers
Sunshine Tour golfers
European Tour golfers
Golfers from Johannesburg
People from Edenvale, Gauteng
White South African people
1970 births
Living people